The Blue Norther Stakes is an American Thoroughbred horse race held annually near the end of December at Santa Anita Park in Arcadia, California. Open to two-year-old fillies, the non-graded stakes is contested on turf over a distance of one mile (8 furlongs).

The race is named for Blue Norther, a top filly in United States racing in 1964.

The 2009 edition was run on New Year's Day, 2010.

Winners since 2001

References
 The Blue Norther Stakes at Pedigree Query
 The Blue Norther Stakes at Santa Anita Park

Flat horse races for two-year-old fillies
Ungraded stakes races in the United States
Horse races in California
Turf races in the United States
Santa Anita Park
Recurring sporting events established in 1997
1997 establishments in California